Hemineura is a genus of insects belonging to the family Elipsocidae.

The species of this genus are found in Europe and Northern America.

Species:
 Hemineura bigoti Badonnel, 1970 
 Hemineura blascoi Baz, 1994

References

Elipsocidae
Psocoptera genera